The Outstanding Women in Nation’s Service (TOWNS) award is presented by the TOWNS Foundation to outstanding Filipino women ages 21 to 45 years old who have contributed positively to strengthening national capability and shaping the nation’s future and served as catalysts for economic, social and cultural development, national security and national unity by providing their time, talent and resources. The award is given every three years during the last week of October. Since its inception in 1974, TOWNS has cited 189 women (as of 2022).

The Awardees

References

1974 establishments in the Philippines
Philippine awards